Eugoa quadriplagiata is a moth of the family Erebidae first described by Walter Rothschild in 1915. It is found in Papua New Guinea.

References

quadriplagiata
Moths described in 1915